Todd Howard (born September 10, 1970) is an American college basketball head coach who coached the IUPUI men's basketball team from 2011 to 2014. He is a graduate of the University of Louisville. Howard was hired after serving as an assistant to Ron Hunter for 17 seasons at IUPUI. Howard played under Coach Denny Crum at The University of Louisville, following a successful prep career at Ballard High School in Louisville.

After posting a 26–70 record in three seasons as head coach, Howard was fired from the IUPUI Jaguars on March 9, 2014. On May 12, 2014, he was hired as the head boys' basketball coach at Brebeuf Jesuit Preparatory School in Indianapolis, IN and serves as the coordinator of Brebeuf Jesuit's Ignatian Scholars Program.

Head coaching record

References

External links
 Indiana University-Purdue University Indianapolis – 2012–2013 Men's Basketball Coaching Staff

1970 births
Living people
Ballard High School (Louisville, Kentucky) alumni
Basketball coaches from Kentucky
Basketball players from Louisville, Kentucky
College men's basketball head coaches in the United States
High school basketball coaches in the United States
IUPUI Jaguars men's basketball coaches
Louisville Cardinals men's basketball coaches
Louisville Cardinals men's basketball players
Sportspeople from Louisville, Kentucky
American men's basketball players